"Fester Kun Med Mig Selv" is a single by Danish singer Jon Nørgaard, from his third studio album Uden dig. It was released in Denmark as a digital download on 27 June 2011. The song peaked at number 39 on the Danish Singles Chart.

Track listing
Digital download
 "Fester Kun Med Mig Selv" - 3:37

Chart performance

Release history

References

2011 singles
Jon Nørgaard songs
2011 songs
Universal Music Group singles
Songs written by Jeppe Federspiel
Songs written by Rasmus Stabell
Songs written by Jon Nørgaard